Salle Moulay Abdellah is an indoor sporting arena located in Rabat, Morocco.  The capacity of the arena is 10,000 people.  The arena is used to host indoor sporting events, such as basketball and volleyball.

External links
Venue information

Indoor arenas in Morocco
S
Sport in Rabat
Basketball venues in Morocco
Volleyball venues in Morocco
Handball venues in Morocco